The Independence Party is a liberal-conservative political party in Iceland. It is currently the largest party in the Alþingi, with 17 seats. The chairman of the party is Bjarni Benediktsson and the vice chairman of the party is Þórdís Kolbrún R. Gylfadóttir.

It was formed in 1929 through a merger of the Conservative Party and the Liberal Party. This united the two parties advocating the dissolution of the Union of Denmark and Iceland; dissolution was achieved in 1944, during the German occupation of Denmark. Since its formation in 1929, the party has won the largest share of the vote in every election except the 2009 election, when it fell behind the Social Democratic Alliance. Every Independence Party leader has also at some point held the office of Prime Minister. Since 2013, there have been three different coalition governments in Iceland, all of which have included the Independence Party.

On fiscal issues, the Independence Party is economically liberal, favouring privatisation, and opposed to interventionism. The party is supported most strongly by fishermen and high-earners, particularly in Reykjavík. It is ideologically positioned on the centre-right or right-wing on the political spectrum. It supports Icelandic membership of NATO but opposes the idea of joining the European Union (EU). It is a member of the International Democrat Union.

History
The Independence Party was founded on 25 May 1929 through a merger of the Conservative Party and the Liberal Party. It readopted the name of the historical Independence Party, which had split between the Conservatives and Liberals in 1927. From its first election, in 1931, it was the largest party in Iceland.

The Independence Party has long been dominated by the "Octopus," a group of fourteen families that constitute the country's economic and political elite. Favoured by the electoral system and indirectly controlling the majority of the media, it remains Iceland's largest party, usually winning more than a third of the vote in parliamentary elections.

The Independence Party won the 2007 elections, increasing their seat tally in the Althing by 3. It formed a new coalition government under Geir Haarde with the Social Democratic Alliance, after the Progressive Party lost heavily in the elections. In the 2009 elections, the party dropped from 25–26 to 16 seats in the Althing, becoming Iceland's second-largest party following the Social Democratic Alliance (which gained two seats, to 20.)

The Independence Party re-entered government after the general elections in 2013, gaining 19 seats in parliament and the most votes again becoming Iceland's largest party. The Independence Party hence formed a majority government with the Progressive Party with Bjarni becoming Minister of Finance and Economic Affairs under the premiership of Sigmundur Davíð Gunnlaugsson chairman of the Progressive Party. The government coalition was ended after the Panama Papers revealed that Sigmundur Davíð Gunnlaugsson, Bjarni Benediktsson and other known members of the Independence Party held funds in offshore bank accounts. The general election in 2016 yielded a government consisting of the Independence Party, Bright Future and the Reform Party. With the Independence Party holding 21 seats in Parliament. That government then proceeded to fall apart due to Bjarni Benediktsson's father's ties to a convicted child sex offender that had his criminal records cleared by the Minister of the interior, an Independence Party MP. After the general elections 2017, called after much backlash from this decision, the Independence party formed a new government with the Left-Green Movement and the Progressive Party. The Independence Party had 17 seats in Parliament.

After the 2021 parliamentary election, the new government was, just like the previous government, a tri-party coalition of the Independence Party, the Progressive Party and the Left-Green Movement, headed by Prime Minister Katrín Jakobsdóttir of Left-Green Movement.

Ideology and platform
The Independence Party has been described as conservative, liberal-conservative, conservative-liberal, and Eurosceptic. 

The party has been the sole major politically right-leaning party in Iceland since its inception, and has captured a broad cross-section of centre-right voters. As a result, the party is not as far to the right as most right-wing parties in other Nordic countries, serving as a 'catch-all' party. The party, like the British Conservatives, states a claim to be primarily 'pragmatic', as opposed to ideological, and its name is seen as an allusion to being independent of dogma (with the original meaning, promoting independence from Denmark, having been achieved long ago). For most of its period of political dominance, the party has relied upon coalition government, and has made coalitions with many major parties in parliament.

The Independence Party has generally been economically liberal and advocated limited government intervention in the economy. It was originally committed to laissez-faire economics, but shifted its economic policies leftwards in the 1930s, accepting the creation of a welfare state.

The party is liberal concerning social issues and has historically been less conservative than other centre-right parties in Scandinavia. The party was the only consistent advocate for the end of prohibition of beer, and provided three-quarters of voters in favour of legalisation; the ban was lifted in 1989.

The party's sceptical position on European integration was confirmed at its national congress in March 2009. Its near-permanent position as Iceland's largest party has guaranteed Iceland's Atlanticist stance. The party is in favour of allowing Icelanders to participate in peacekeeping missions, including in Afghanistan.

Organisation and support

Historically, the party has been the most successful liberal conservative party in the Nordic countries. It has a broad base of support, but is most strongly supported by Iceland's large fishing community and by businesses. On the largest divide in Icelandic politics, between urban and rural areas, the Independence Party is firmly supported by rural areas, but its urban support is mostly found in Garðabær and Kópavogur.

The Independence Party has always attempted to avoid appealing to a specific social class. As such, the party is relatively successful at attracting working-class voters, which partly comes from the party's strong advocacy of independence in the 1930s. However, most of its strength is in the middle class, and the party is disproportionately supported by those on high incomes and those with university educations.

The party has long been endorsed by Morgunblaðið, an Icelandic newspaper of record. Davíð Oddsson, Iceland's longest-serving Prime Minister and former leader of the Independence Party, is one of two editors of the paper. The party was also historically supported by the afternoon newspaper Vísir, now part of DV.

The party has a tradition of individualism and strong personalities, which has proven difficult for the leadership to manage. The Commonwealth Party split in 1941, while the Republican Party left in 1953, both in opposition to the leftwards shift of the party away from classical liberalism. Neither splinter group managed to get seats in Althingi and both vanished quickly. The Citizens' Party split from the party in 1983, but collapsed in 1994.

Its youth wing, Young Independents, is by far the largest youth organisation in Iceland, with over 12,000 members. It is slightly more classically liberal than the senior party.

The party has a very large membership base, with 15% of the total population being a member of the party.

International relations
For years the Independence party was a member of the European People's Party that includes members such as the Conservative Party (Norway), Moderate Party (Sweden), The Republicans (France), the National Coalition Party (Finland), and Christian Democratic Union  of Germany. But with a new more Eurosceptic leadership of the party it joined the European Conservatives and Reformists Party in November 2011, a centre-right Eurosceptic political organisation. As of 2021 the Independence Party is no longer a member of the ECR Party and currently has no European party group affiliation.

Election results

Leadership

Footnotes

References

External links
Official website 
The National Youth Organisation of the Independence Party, named Samband ungra sjálfstæðismanna or SUS in Icelandic, is one of the oldest political youth movements in Iceland.
About the Independence Party

 
1929 establishments in Iceland
Conservative parties in Iceland
Eurosceptic parties in Iceland
Liberal conservative parties
Centre-right parties in Europe
Political parties established in 1929